Kalina is a surname. Notable people with the surname include:

 Harold Kalina, American judge and politician
 Jozef Kalina, Slovak basketball player
 Klāra Kaliņa (1874–1964), Latvian feminist, suffragette, editor and politician
 Noah Kalina, American photographer
 Robert Kalina, Austrian banknote designer
 Václav Kalina, Czech footballer

See also

Karlina